Poplar Plains may refer to a location in the United States:

Poplar Plains, Connecticut, a census-designated place in the town of Westport
Poplar Plains, Kentucky, an unincorporated community in Fleming County